Shorncliffe Lodge in Sandgate, Kent, was a well appointed weekend house that belonged to Edward Albert Sassoon and Aline Caroline de Rothschild. It was sold in 1912 by Philip Sassoon to fund the purchase of land on which he built Port Lympne Mansion.

History 
The property was purchased in 1912 after Edward Sassoon's successful election in a by-election at Hythe, Kent, a constituency that had been represented by Meyer de Rothschild from 1859 to 1874. The area had strong Rothschild connections. Edward's in laws had owned property there since early in the nineteenth century, using it as a staging point for couriers and carrier pigeons for their communication system with the Continent.

The parents of Roger Keyes lived in the Lodge. The Freemason Lodge of St Mark No. 6969 was formed in 1921 in the Lodge.

In 1974, the Lodge became a grade II listed building.

Description
Shorncliffe is a Grade II Listed Building. Date listed: 17 April 1974, English Heritage Building ID: 175442, OS Grid REference: TR2025635290, OS Grid Coordinates: 620256, 135290, Latitude/ Longitude: 51.0746, 1.1428

Further reading 

 Sassoon. The worlds of Philip and Sybil by Peter Stansky Yale University Press

References

External links 

 Description on the Rothschild Archives

Grade II listed buildings in Kent
Houses in Kent
Grade II listed houses
Country houses in Kent
Rothschild family residences